Michael Groß (born 17 June 1964), usually spelled Michael Gross in English, is a former competitive swimmer from Germany. Gross, competing for West Germany, won three Olympic gold medals, two in 1984 and one in 1988 in the freestyle and butterfly events, in addition to two World Championship titles in 1982, two in 1986 and one in 1991.

Career 
Gross was born in Frankfurt am Main, West Germany, and trained as a member of the swimming club EOSC Offenbach. He was probably the finest swimmer in the world in the 200-meter butterfly race from 1981 to 1988. In this period he set four world records, won two world titles, four European titles and two Olympic gold medals.

At the 1984 Summer Olympics in Los Angeles, Gross was one of the great athletes of the games. Gross easily won gold in the 200-meter freestyle, dominating the field. In the 100-meter butterfly, however, Gross pulled off a bit of an upset, winning over the favorite in the event, American Pablo Morales. However, in the 200-meter butterfly, Gross himself was upset by a relative unknown, Australian Jon Sieben. The men's 4×200-meter freestyle relay race became one of the marquee events of the games, with Gross leading the German relay against the underdog American squad. Despite the fact that Gross swam the fastest relay leg in the event's history, the American team pulled off the upset, earning the title of the "Grossbusters."

Gross won a total of thirteen medals at the World Championships (including five gold), thirteen gold medals at the European Championships and was elected German "Athlete of the Year" four times (1982, 1983, 1984 and 1988). He retired from professional swimming in 1991.

He is featured in Bud Greenspan's 16 Days of Glory, the documentary film of the 1984 Summer Olympics.

American gold medalist swimmer John Naber remarked to Sports Illustrated in 1984 that if Michael Gross were an American, he would have won six or seven medals and that Gross was better than Mark Spitz.

Gross was named Male World Swimmer of the Year by Swimming World Magazine in 1985 and inducted to the International Swimming Hall of Fame in 1995.

Gross studied German and media studies as well as political science at the Goethe University Frankfurt and holds a PhD in philology. He married in 1995 and has a daughter (born 1996) and a son (born 1998).

See also
 List of members of the International Swimming Hall of Fame
 German records in swimming
 List of multiple Olympic medalists at a single Games
 World record progression 100 metres butterfly
 World record progression 100 metres freestyle
 World record progression 200 metres butterfly
 World record progression 200 metres freestyle
 World record progression 400 metres freestyle
 World record progression 800 metres freestyle
 World record progression 4 × 200 metres freestyle relay

References

External links
 

1964 births
Living people
Sportspeople from Frankfurt
German male butterfly swimmers
Swimmers at the 1984 Summer Olympics
Swimmers at the 1988 Summer Olympics
Olympic swimmers of West Germany
Olympic gold medalists for West Germany
Olympic silver medalists for West Germany
Olympic bronze medalists for West Germany
World record setters in swimming
Olympic bronze medalists in swimming
German male freestyle swimmers
World Aquatics Championships medalists in swimming
European Aquatics Championships medalists in swimming
Medalists at the 1988 Summer Olympics
Medalists at the 1984 Summer Olympics
Olympic gold medalists in swimming
Olympic silver medalists in swimming
Universiade medalists in swimming
Universiade gold medalists for West Germany
Universiade bronze medalists for West Germany
Medalists at the 1985 Summer Universiade